Indian Mountain is a Canadian community, located in Westmorland County, New Brunswick. It is situated in southeastern New Brunswick, to the northwest of Moncton.  Indian Mountain is part of Greater Moncton.  Indian Mountain is located on New Brunswick Route 126

History

Places of note
Magnetic Hill School
Country Meadows Golf Club
Lutes Mountain Meeting House
Lutes Mountain Church of the Nazarene
Lyons Country Store

See also
Greater Moncton
List of entertainment events in Greater Moncton
List of communities in New Brunswick

Notable people

References

Bordering communities

Communities in Westmorland County, New Brunswick
Communities in Greater Moncton